Chedi-Kholsky District (Çedi-Xöl kojuun) is an administrative and municipal district (raion, or kozhuun), one of the seventeen in the Tuva Republic, Russia. It is located in the center of the republic. Its administrative center is the rural locality (a selo) of Khovu-Aksy. Population:  8,081 (2002 Census). The population of Khovu-Aksy accounts for 47.8% of the district's total population.

History
Chaa-Kholsky District was established in 1993.

References

Notes

Sources

Districts of Tuva

